The International Journal of Political Economy is a peer-reviewed academic journal that publishes scholarly research on political economics. The journal was formerly published as International Journal of Politics. Many of the articles are English translations of scholarly work from around the world. Article themes include the conditions of economic growth, governmental intervention in the market economy, and modernization and democratization theories.

References 

Political Economy, International Journal of
Routledge academic journals
Publications established in 1971
English-language journals
Political science journals